The Itzik Manger Prize for outstanding contributions to Yiddish literature was established in 1968, shortly before Itzik Manger's death in 1969. Manger "was and remains one of the best-known twentieth-century Yiddish poets." The Prize has been described as the "most prestigious in Yiddish letters". Apparently no Manger Prizes have been awarded after 1999.

History
The prize was initiated by Meyer Weisgal, who was frustrated when Manger—then very ill—was denied the Israel Prize. The inaugural prize was given to Manger himself at a banquet on October 31, 1968. The banquet was attended by Golda Meir, then the prime minister of Israel, and by Zalman Shazar, then president. Subsequently the prize was awarded annually, sometimes to several writers.

List of recipients

1969: Abraham Sutzkever, Aaron Zeitlin
1970: Yankev Fridman, Chaim Grade, Yoysef Kerler
1971: Kadia Molodowsky, Yekhiel Hofer,
1972: Maurice Samuel, Isaiah Spiegel
1973: Isaac Bashevis Singer
1974: Joseph Buloff, Rachel Korn
1975: Rajzel Zychlinsky
1976: Arye Shamri, Leyzer Aykhenrand
1977: Yehuda Elberg, Yankev-Tsvi Shargel 
1978: Rokhl Fishman, Meyer Stiker, Uri Zevi Greenberg, Eli Schechtman, Mordecai Strigler
1979: Chava Rosenfarb, Shloyme Rotman, Shimshen Meltser, Shloyme Shenhod, Avrom Zak
1980: Samson Dunsky, Zyame Telesin, Jonas Turkow, Tsvi Ayznman, Nakhmen Rap, Yitskhok Yanasovitsh
1981: Binem Heller, Elias Lipiner, Abraham Karpinowitz, Malka Heifetz Tussman, 
1982: Yaakov Zipper
1983: Chone Szmeruk, Moishe Valdman, David E. Wolpe, 
1984: Rivka Basman Ben-Hayim, Yosl Lerner, Eliezer Podriachik
1985: Dov Seltzer, Itche Goldberg
1986: Pesach Burstein, Samuel L. Schneiderman, Elias Schulman
1988: Dina Halpern, Chava Turniansky, Ruth R. Wisse
1991: Yossl Birstein, Yonia Fain
1994: Mordkhe Schaechter, Rafael Chwoles
1997: Dovid Katz, Lev Berinski, Yiddishpiel
1998: Dan Miron,
1999: Chava Alberstein, Joshua Fishman, Yenta Mash
Zvi Kanar, Joseph Mloteck

References

Further reading
 Citations noting the work Leksikon fun yidish-shraybers refer to 

Yiddish-language literature
Israeli literary awards
1968 establishments in Israel
Awards established in 1968